Royal Thunder is an American rock band from Atlanta, Georgia, founded in 2004 by guitarist Josh Weaver. Their style of hard rock takes its primary influence from classic rock and 1990s grunge with elements of progressive rock and psychedelic rock. Rolling Stone has described the band as "a bit like an alternate universe where Janis Joplin fronted Led Zeppelin."

Biography
After forming in 2004 with Weaver on guitar, Mlny Parsonz on vocals and bass, and Jesse Stuber on drums, Royal Thunder self-released a self-titled EP in 2007, after which the band was signed to Relapse Records. Relapse released their first full-length album CVI in 2012, featuring new rhythm guitarist Josh Coleman. In a review of the album, AllMusic noted the band's unique sound combining the heavy side of 90s grunge, classic hard rock, and alternative rock. Stuber left the band and was replaced by Lee Smith, who had played on one track on CVI. Smith was soon replaced on drums by Evan DiPrima, and Coleman was replaced by guitarist Will Fiore, forming a lineup that would remain intact for the next six years.

Royal Thunder released the album Crooked Doors in 2015. The album was themed around the breakup of the marriage between Parsonz and Weaver, with lyrics that critics compared to the Fleetwood Mac album Rumours. Some of the lyrics also described Parsonz's membership in a religious cult. Crooked Doors was noted as being more varied and progressive than its predecessor, while Parsonz's bluesy, waling voice and harrowing lyrics gained the attention of critics.

The band's third album Wick was released in 2017 by Spinefarm Records. In a review of the album, Rolling Stone praised Parsonz for her "raspy, powerful wail [which] is one of the most moving voices in rock right now," and noted that the band "has found its sound." Classic Rock Magazine described the album as the band's most powerful yet, with "a shifting musical bedrock over which Parsonz... delivers the kind of vocals – sometimes armoured, sometimes vulnerable – that can emote, transport and illuminate in equal measure." Drummer Evan DiPrima left the band on good terms in 2018 and was temporarily replaced by Kent Aberle; DiPrima returned in 2020. Guitarist Will Fiore then departed and the band has continued as a trio.

Discography

Studio albums
CVI (2012)
Crooked Doors (2015)
Wick (2017)

EPs
Royal Thunder (2010)
CVI: A (2013)

References

External links

American hard rock musical groups
Musical groups established in 2004
Musical groups from Atlanta
Musical quartets
2004 establishments in Illinois